The 1925 Australian federal election was held in Australia on 14 November 1925. All 75 seats in the House of Representatives and 22 of the 36 seats in the Senate were up for election. The incumbent Nationalist–Country coalition, led by Prime Minister Stanley Bruce, defeated the opposition Labor Party led by Matthew Charlton in a landslide. This was the first time any party had won a fourth consecutive federal election.

Compulsory voting for federal elections was introduced in 1924 and first used in the 1925 elections, where 91.4% of the electorate cast a vote, compared to 59.4% at the 1922 elections.

Campaign
Prime Minister Stanley Bruce was a supporter of the White Australia Policy, and made it an issue in his campaign for the 1925 Australian Federal election.It is necessary that we should determine what are the ideals towards which every Australian would desire to strive. I think those ideals might well be stated as being to secure our national safety, and to ensure the maintenance of our White Australia Policy to continue as an integral portion of the British Empire. We intend to keep this country white and not allow its people to be faced with the problems that at present are practically insoluble in many parts of the world.

Results

House of Representatives

Notes
 Independents: Percy Stewart (Wimmera, Vic.), William Watson (Fremantle, WA).
 Labor lost Kennedy, Qld., when the sitting member Charles McDonald died on the day before the election, leading to his opponent Grosvenor Francis being declared elected unopposed.

Senate

Seats changing hands

 Members listed in italics did not contest their seat at this election.
 *Figure is Nationalist versus Labor.

See also
 Candidates of the Australian federal election, 1925
 Members of the Australian House of Representatives, 1925–1928
 Members of the Australian Senate, 1926–1929

Endnotes
Notes

Citations

References
University of WA election results in Australia since 1890
Two-party-preferred vote since 1919
Compulsory Voting in Australia

Federal elections in Australia
1925 elections in Australia
November 1925 events